The 2006 Asian Games opening ceremony was held on 1 December at the multi-purpose Khalifa International Stadium. The Opening Ceremony was described by the media to be one of the most breath-taking and technologically spectacular multi-sports event ceremony, and the most expensive multi-sports event ceremony (including both Opening and Closing ceremonies) in the history of Asian Games at that time. It was created and produced by David Atkins who conducted the 2000 Summer Olympics opener and was filmed and broadcast live by International Games Broadcast Services' (IGBS) precursor Doha Asian Games Broadcast Services (DAGBS). 10 composers from Qatar, Lebanon, Egypt, Singapore, Japan, India, South Korea, Germany and Australia made the musical scores of the ceremonies.

Proceedings

Pre-ceremonial events
Prior to the opening ceremony, Qatari youngsters spent 10 minutes creating a traditional Qatari Al Sadu carpet on the stadium floor. This was followed by youngsters from ASPIRE, who raced around the stadium chasing Orry, the Games’ mascot to represent Qatar’s bid to make the country the sports capital of the Middle East.

Preface
The ceremony started with the welcome of Emir of Qatar Sheikh Hamad bin Khalifa Al Thani, OCA chairman Sheikh Ahmed Al-Fahad and their wives into the stadium.

Countdown
After that, a 10-second countdown projection on the stadium floor began to signal the starting of the opening ceremony. A group of 2,300 young people then used flares to form the national flag followed by the message with the Arabic and English greeting of "As-salamu alaykum" ("peace upon to you").

Main event
A group of children, led by Nasser Khaled Al Kubaisi, then sang Qatar's national anthem after the raising of the national flag by the Qatari Armed Forces personnel.

A cultural performance about the story of a "Seeker" and his journey to Asia was presented, began with a footage that transits from an atom, the Universe, Milky Way, Solar System and Earth to the games' host nation Qatar's landscape. The main character of the story was played by local actor, Adel Al Ansari.

The show tells about a man called the "Seeker" who was born and live in the nation of Qatar, where people of the desert and the people of the sea dwells together. The people of the desert are experts in poetry, while the people of the sea are experts in fishing for pearls named "tears of the moon". As a boy, he dreamed of following a falcon that leads him up to a tower and finds an Astrolabe, an instrument used to make astronomical measurements. When the boy grew up into a young man, he left behind his family and his love, and began his adventure in a pearling boat, searching for pearls which locals called 'tears of the moon" with a few pearl divers from his homeland, guided only by the stars and his astrolabe. One day, he encountered a fierce storm at sea that overturned the pearling boats of the pearl divers that followed him. Most of them are lost, either drowned or engulfed by strange creatures and never return to their families. He later also encountered a terrifying and colossal half-human half-amphibian sea Jinn named Abu Darya (meaning in Arabic "Lord of the Sea"), who threatened to destroy his ship and devour him. Fortunately, he was rescued by a giant falcon who defeated the jinn, landing him on safe ground where he continued his path to Asia and discovered its colourful history and cultures. The Angkor Wat, the Taj Mahal, the Temple of Heaven and Borobudur were among the important landmarks he passed. The Seeker was also treated to a multicultural presentation that displayed the cultures of different Asian regions such as Chinese, Japanese, Indian, Indonesian, Kazakh and Thai culture. Many people in the continent came to greet him, sent him gifts such as gold, silk, spices and incense. Meanwhile, back at the seeker's homeland, his love was in despair, waiting for his arrival. With his Asian brothers helping him in his way back to his homeland, the Seeker safely made it back to his love, and invited all of Asia to celebrate their wedding as guests. To honour his guests, the Seeker presented them horsemen performance. Years later, the Seeker had a son. He showed him the Arab world's contributions to modern science in the past, the present and the future, Qatar's natural resources and its vision for the future.

Delegates from the 45 countries and regions of Asia entered the stadium after Hong Kong artist Jacky Cheung sang "Together Now". As host nation, Qatar enters the stadium last. For the fifth time after the 2000 Summer Olympics, 2002 Asian Games, 2004 Summer Olympics, and the 2006 Winter Olympics, North Korea and South Korea jointly entered the stadium under Korean Unification Flag. Once all the delegates gathered inside the stadium, India's Bollywood star Sunidhi Chauhan sang "Reach Out". Hundreds of performers brought out doves sculptures and form the word peace, which serves as the games' message. Then, Sheikh Tamim bin Hamad Al Thani, the games' organising committee chairman and Olympic Council of Asia chairman Sheikh Ahmad Al-Fahad Al-Sabah gave their respective speeches and emir of Qatar, Sheikh Hamad bin Khalifa Al Thani declared the games opened. The armed forces personnel later raised the flag of the Olympic Council of Asia (OCA), the games' governing body which was brought in by representatives of Reach Out To Asia (ROTA), a Qatari charity organisation. The flag bore the old logo of the Olympic Council of Asia, which was replaced by a new and current version the following day at the Flag Square of the Asian Games Athletes village. Mubarak Eid Belal, Qatar's volleyball player took the athletes' oath, while Abdullah Al Balushi, Qatar's football referee took the judges' oath.

Before the torch relay section, Lebanon's Majida El Roumi and Spanish tenor José Carreras performed "Light the Way". The torch was relayed into the stadium by bowler Salem Bu Sharbak, volleyball player Mubarak Mustafa, shooter Nasser Al-Atiyya, Mohamed Suleiman, footballer Mansoor Muftah Sheikh and Talal Mansour. Mohammed Bin Hamad Al-Thani son of the emir and captain of the Qatar equestrian endurance team rode his horse up the stairs to the top of the stadium to light up the giant cauldron in the form of a giant astrolabe. The flame was transferred electronically to the Aspire Tower just outside the stadium, and fireworks soon went off, signalling the start of the 2006 Asian Games. The horse nearly slipped in the process and a clip of this was internationally viewed.

Parade of Nations

All 45 contingents participated in the parade in English alphabetical order, from Afghanistan to Yemen with host Qatar marching last. The traditional music of several Asian regions accompanied the athletes as they marched into the stadium.

Whilst most countries entered under their short names, a few entered under alternative names, sometimes due to political disputes. Taiwan (Republic of China) entered with the compromised name and flag of "Chinese Taipei" under T so that they did not enter together with conflicting "China", which entered under C. 

North Korea and South Korea marched together under the Korean Unification Flag, but competed separately.

While the placards were displayed only in English, both English and Arabic announcers were present.

Notes
 Three teams entered under their short names in English, but their full names in Arabic:
 Jordan entered as "Hashemite Kingdom of Jordan".
 Kuwait entered as "State of Kuwait".
 Palestine entered as "State of Palestine".
 For unknown reasons, Hong Kong was announced as هُونْغ كُونْغ، الصين Hung Kung, Alsiyn in Arabic, while Macau was announced as "Macau, China" (in English by the Arabic-language announcer).

Notable guests

Qataris
 Hamad bin Khalifa Al Thani, Emir of Qatar
 Moza bint Nasser, Consort of Emir of Qatar
 Tamim bin Hamad Al Thani, Heir Apparent of Qatar and games' organising committee chairman
 Abdullah bin Khalifa Al Thani, Prime Minister of Qatar
 Jassem bin Hamad Al Thani, the personal representative of the Emir of Qatar

Foreign dignitaries
 International Olympic Committee president Jacques Rogge 
 Sheikh Ahmad Al-Fahad Al-Sabah, chairman of the Olympic Council of Asia
 FIFA president Sepp Blatter
 Iranian President Mahmoud Ahmadinejad
 Palestinian Prime Minister Ismail Haniyeh 
 Syrian President Bashar Assad

References

Opening Ceremony, 2006 Asian Games
Asian Games opening ceremonies
Ceremonies in Qatar